Craig Parnham (born 13 July 1973 in Bridgnorth, Shropshire) is an English field hockey defender and coach. He represented Great Britain in two Summer Olympics in 2000 and 2004, and played club hockey for Stourport, Bridgnorth and Cannock.

Parnham made his debut for Great Britain in 2000, shortly before being included in the team for the 2000 Summer Olympics. The following year he made his debut for England, where he was appointed captain.

He sustained a near-fatal throat injury in 2002, when he was caught in the throat by a flying stick while playing for England in Malaysia. His larynx required rebuilding.

In total, Parnham won 64 caps for Great Britain and 51 for England. He is now a coach, and has taken the Great Britain women's team to the 2008 and 2012 Olympic Games. In January 2013 he was appointed head coach of the USA Women's National Team.

References

 Profile on Athens 2004 site

External links

1973 births
English male field hockey players
Male field hockey defenders
English field hockey coaches
Field hockey players at the 2000 Summer Olympics
2002 Men's Hockey World Cup players
Field hockey players at the 2004 Summer Olympics
Living people
Olympic field hockey players of Great Britain
British male field hockey players
People educated at Bromsgrove School
People from Bridgnorth
American Olympic coaches
Cannock Hockey Club players